Parashuram Krishna Gode, was a Sanskrit and Prakrit scholar and the first curator of the Bhandarkar Oriental Research Institute.

References

External links
 
  Works at Google Books
  oclc.org

1891 births
1961 deaths
Indian Sanskrit scholars
Marathi people